Potamites strangulatus, the big-scaled neusticurus, is a species of lizard in the family Gymnophthalmidae. It is found in Ecuador and Peru.

References

Potamites
Reptiles described in 1868
Taxa named by Edward Drinker Cope